= Bommasamudram =

- village
- Interactive map of Bommasamudram
- Location in Andhra Pradesh, India Bommasamudram (India)
- Coordinates: 13°17′0″N 79°3′0″E
- Country: India
- State: Andhra Pradesh

Population
  - Total: 650

Languages
  - Official: Telugu
- Time zone: UTC+5:30 (IST)

Bommasamudram is a village in Chittoor district, Andhra Pradesh. This village is also called 44 Bommasamudram.

== Administration ==
Bommasamudram Panchayath Gudipala mandal Chittoor Dist -

== Demographics ==
The total population of this village is around 1000.
